Kulu is a town and district of Konya Province in the Central Anatolia region of Turkey. According to the 2011 census, the population of the district is 55,573 and 22,844 of that number live in the town of Kulu. Kulu is situated approximately 110 km from Ankara and 150 km from the city of Konya. With a substantial Swedish-Turkish community, not few of whom are from this region, Swedish Prime Minister Fredrik Reinfeldt visited the city once.

Climate
Kulu has a semi-arid climate with hot and dry summers and cold and snowy winters.

Notes

References

External links
 District governor's official website 
 District municipality's official website 
 Best Private Site of Kulu 

 KuluRadyo Tv , Kulu , Konya https://web.archive.org/web/20140724050137/http://www.kuluradyo.com/

 
Populated places in Konya Province
Kurdish settlements in Turkey
Districts of Konya Province